Stawno may refer to the following places:
Stawno, Greater Poland Voivodeship (west-central Poland)
Stawno, Drawsko County in West Pomeranian Voivodeship (north-west Poland)
Stawno, Goleniów County in West Pomeranian Voivodeship (north-west Poland)
Stawno, Gryfice County in West Pomeranian Voivodeship (north-west Poland)
Stawno, Kamień County in West Pomeranian Voivodeship (north-west Poland)
Stawno, Myślibórz County in West Pomeranian Voivodeship (north-west Poland)